Speculative Fiction Group (Persian: گروه ادبیات گمانه‌زن) formerly known as Fantasy Academy (Persian:آکادمی فانتزی) is a Persian literature group whose main representation media is the website Fantasy Academy (www.fantasy.ir). Speculative Fiction Group (SFG) is composed of a group of writers, researchers, translators and fans of science-fiction, fantasy, horror fiction, and detective literary genres. The group is the governing body of the Persian Speculative Fiction Art and Literature Award, Shegetzar online magazine, Persian Speculative Encyclopedia, and Persian SF&F Fanzine.

The group has an English portal for its main site and has established a MediaWiki-based encyclopedia of science fiction and fantasy.

History

SFG started as a fanzine club named Zirabious in early 2004, and in 2005, after renaming itself to Fantasy Academy, changed its approach to a more academic path and became the sole reference for Persian speculative fiction, specially science fiction, since there was no group or organization working in this area.  In 2010, the group reformed again to separate the fan base from academic activities, and all fan activities moved to a new website called Fanzine (Persian: فنزین).

Officially established in 2004, the group was founded on an earlier local private group called Seventh Dimension. Fantasy Academy has developed in several aspects. Primarily, the main focus of the group was to introduce and localize the two main subgenres of speculative fiction: fantasy and science fiction. However, other subgenres, including horror fiction, have since been added.

Group structure
SFG is a combination of several subgroups, each of them devoted to specific activities. All groups work independently in their area.

Main aim
The official aim of the group is to maintain effective support to the speculative genre developed and published in the Persian language. The group also tries to introduce and support all new Persian writers and intellectuals in this genre.

Head and coordinator
Each group of the body has its own coordinating members. However, the person who represents the group holds the title of "chief editor", an official member of the group who is chosen by the members casually for an indefinite term. The current chief editor is Mehdi Bonvari.

Major subgroups

 Shegeft-zar Magazine (wonderland): electronic monthly magazine run by members and an editor.
 Fanzine): gathering place for people who love the genre.
 English Portal: run by one of the Academy members, this group tries to translate literature products from Persian to English.
 Persian Speculative Art and Literature Award: conducts the group's annual ceremony and is responsible for the Persian Speculative Fiction Short Story Contest.

Persian Speculative Fiction Short Story Contest

This is an annual award presented by the Persian Fantasy Academy. The award is given to the best short story of the year in the field of science fiction, horror fiction, or fantasy. The winner is selected from all participants of the yearly contest. The contest starts in winter every year and ends in the spring, and the results are announced during the summer. All submitted stories must be written in Persian but the authors may be of any nationality.

The first award was given in 2004, and the jury members all belonged to the Persian Fantasy Academy Group.
The following year, the group invited well-known and notable authors, critics, and translators of Persian literature to join the committee. Among these  were: Média Kashigar, Reza Alizade, Mitra Eliati, Arash Hejazi, Peyman Ghasemkhani, Shahram Eghbal Zadeh, Vida Eslamie, and Mehdi Yazdani Khoram.

Persian Speculative Fiction Art and Literature Award

This is a yearly event which takes place in July. Awards granted for the best science fiction or fantasy works and achievements of the previous year.

The award is accompanied with a great convention of all speculative fiction proponents and is the main event of its field in Iran.

Award categories
 Best Sf&f short story selected by the jury.
 Best Sf&f translator
 Best Sf&f publisher
 Most active person in Sf&f literature

External links
 Official website

Science fiction organizations
Persian literature